Abalone is a common name for any of a group of small to very large sea snails, marine gastropod molluscs in the family Haliotidae.

Abalone may also refer to:

 Abalone (board game), an abstract board game
 USS Abalone (SP-208), a U.S Navy patrol boat during World War I
 Abalone (molecular mechanics), graphics software

See also
Haliotis, the genus containing abalone
Nacre, or mother of pearl, an organic-inorganic composite material produced by abalone
Abalone Alliance, an American non-violent civil disobedience group 1977–1985
Abelone, a synonym for the grape variety Chasselas